Bad Girls Go to Hell is a 1965 American sexploitation film written, produced and directed by Doris Wishman. The film stars Gigi Darlene, Sam Stewart, Barnard L. Sackett, and Darlene Bennett.

Plot

Meg (Gigi Darlene) is a Boston housewife, who is sexually assaulted by a custodian at her apartment building. Killing him during the attack, she flees to New York City. She is then befriended by a series of people with whom she becomes emotionally and sexually involved, all the while trying to evade a narrowing police dragnet. The film is structured around a long dream sequence and features a surprise ending. It contains soft-core sexual situations.

Cast
 Gigi Darlene as Meg Kelton / Ellen Green
 George La Rocque as the Husband who rapes Meg
 Sam Stewart as Ed Bains
 Gertrude Cross (as Sandee Norman) as Mrs. Thorne
 Alan Feinstein (as Alan Yorke) as Ted Kelton
 Barnard L. Sackett (as Bernard L. Sankett) as Tom
 Darlene Bennett as Tracy / Della
 Marlene Starr as the Wife who rents Meg the room (and the actress who appears on the cover)
 Harold Key as the custodian

Home media 
In 2008, Apprehensive Films released Bad Girls Go to Hell on DVD.

See also
 List of American films of 1965

References

External links

 at The Criterion Collection

Reviews
Acid Radio - review
Cultflicks - review and triva
Turner Classic Movies - review
Bright Lights Film Journal - Analysis of title sequence

1965 films
American LGBT-related films
American black-and-white films
1960s English-language films
1960s exploitation films
Films directed by Doris Wishman
Lesbian-related films
Films set in Boston
Films set in New York City
Films about dreams
1965 LGBT-related films
1960s American films